The 2018 Liga 3 Bali was the third edition of Liga 3 Bali as a qualifying round for the Lesser Sunda Islands (Bali Nusra) regional round of 2018 Liga 3. Persekaba Bali were the defending champions. The competition started on 2 July 2018 and finished on 18 July 2018.

Putra Tresna won their first Liga 3 Bali title following a 2–0 victory over Perseden Denpasar after extra time on 18 July 2018. Putra Tresna would represent Bali Region for the Lesser Sunda Islands regional round.

Format
In this competition, the teams were divided into two groups of five. The two best teams were through to knockout stage. The winner represented Bali Region in Lesser Sunda Islands regional round of 2018 Liga 3.

Teams
There were 10 teams participated in the league this season.

Group stage
This stage started on 2 July 2018 and finished on 11 July 2018.

Group A
 All matches held in Ngurah Rai Stadium, Denpasar
 Times listed are local (UTC+8:00)

|}

Group B
 All matches held in Kompyang Sujana Stadium, Denpasar
 Times listed are local (UTC+8:00)

|}

Knockout stage

Semifinals

|}

Third place

|}

Final

|}

References 

2018 in Indonesian football
Sport in Bali